"Furthest Thing" is a song by Canadian rapper Drake, recorded for his studio album Nothing Was the Same. The track was written by Drake, Anthony Palman, Noah "40" Shebib, Marvin "Hagler" Thomas and Adrian Eccleston, and produced by 40, Thomas and Jake One. It reached number 191 in France, number 95 in the UK, and number 56 on the US Billboard Hot 100.

Production and composition
"Furthest Thing" was written by Drake, Anthony Palman, Noah "40" Shebib, Marvin "Hagler" Thomas and Adrian Eccleston, with 40, Thomas and Jake One producing it. In addition to Drake's lead vocals, the original track includes Brian Hamilton, Deborah Vernal, Jennifer Tulloch, Omar Richards, Owen Lee, Patricia Shirley and Rachel Craig as backing vocalists.

Chart positions

Certifications

References

2013 songs
Drake (musician) songs
Songs written by Drake (musician)
Song recordings produced by 40 (record producer)
Songs written by 40 (record producer)
Songs written by Anthony Palman